Volleyball was contested at the 2005 West Asian Games in Doha, Qatar from 2 December to 9 December. All events took place at Al-Rayyan Indoor Hall.

Results

|}

References
 Results

External links
Official website (archived)

2005 West Asian Games
West Asian Games
2005 West Asian Games